The State Snowmobile Trail System in New York State has over  of snowmobile trails that stretch from one end of the state to the other, crossing both public and private land. The trail system is administered by the New York State Office of Parks, Recreation and Historic Preservation (NYS OPRHP) and is maintained by snowmobile clubs which are funded by a portion of snowmobile registration fees. Most of the clubs are members of the New York State Snowmobile Association. Snowmobiling conservatively generates $868 million per year for the New York State economy.

Corridor trails
Corridor trails are high-volume primary routes that provide access to high-use areas and large concentrations of snowmobiles. Some corridor trails run concurrently on occasion and some corridor route numbers are reused in different areas of the state. They are funded by the state.

Secondary trails
Secondary trails are medium-volume routes that connect local attractions and high concentrations of snowmobiles to corridor trails. They are funded by the state.

Local trails
Local trails are low to medium and sometimes high volume routes that connect local attractions and snowmobilers to secondary and corridor trails. They are funded by the local clubs.

Trail system expansion
The Empire State Trail that will be completed by 2020 will allow snowmobiling on portions of the trail, allowing the New York State Snowmobile Trail System to add trails.

Trail problems
At times some trails have to be altered due to private property being sold or due to snowmobilers damaging private property.

 A trail in the town of Redfield in Oswego County and the town of Worth in Jefferson County was closed in the 2017-2018 season due to a dispute between the property owner and local officials.

References

Tourism in New York (state)
Snowmobile trails in New York (state)